Supercry is the second studio album by Australian recording artist Emma Louise, released on 15 July 2016. The album debuted at number 14 on the ARIA Albums Chart. 

Emma Louise toured the album throughout October and November 2016.

Singles
"Underflow" was released as the lead single on 7 November 2015. The music video premiered on 14 December 2015. The song placed second at the 2016 Vanda & Young Global Songwriting Competition.

"Talk Baby Talk", was released as the second single on 18 March 2016. Paul McBridge from Music Feeds called it "an emotion-charged last roll of the relationship dice."
 
"West End Kids" was released as the third single on 8 July 2016. Its video premiered in August 2016 which Sosefina Fuamoli from The Music AU described as "Creepy, hypnotic and captivating".

"Illuminate" was released in October 2016 as the fourth and final single. A video was released to promote the single. Emma Louise said about the song "It's about coming out of a dark time and being determined to turn yourself around for good."

A video for "I Thought I Was a Ship" was released in July 2016 to promote the album, with auspOp saying "It's clear that 'I Thought I Was a Ship' isn't single material, but it's an utterly beautiful sub-five minute advertisement for the album."

Reception

 
Clare Armstrong from The Music said "Supercry is the kind of thoughtful pop that has you still thinking about the songs days later."

Natalia Morawski from The Brag said "The top half of the album is radio-ready, with its catchy hooks and big production, but the back end is where Louise shines." calling the album "A pleasure to hear".

Claire Arnold from The AU Review said "Supercry is exquisitely produced, articulating intimate emotions with immense vulnerability and competence. Fusing hauntingly beautiful vocals with delicate keys, Emma Louise continues to craft blissful indie pop that is earnest and relatable."

Paul McBridge from Music Feeds said "Supercrywill soothe your tortured soul and ease you into a state of transcendence within no time at all. By the end of a first listen it's still not clear exactly what a Supercry is, but with this collection of songs, Emma Louise has cemented her place as one of Australia's finest young songwriters."

Track listing

Charts

Release history

References

 
2016 albums
Emma Louise albums
Liberation Records albums